Ruslan Khasinovich Bolov (born 7 May 1994) is a Russian professional football player. He plays in Kazakhstan for FC Okzhetpes.

Club career
He made his Russian Premier League debut for PFC Spartak Nalchik on 18 March 2012 in a game against FC Krylia Sovetov Samara.

He played in the 2017–18 Russian Cup final for FC Avangard Kursk on the 9 May 2018 in the Volgograd Arena against 2-1 winners FC Tosno.

Honours

Individual 
CIS Cup top goalscorer: 2014 (shared)

References

External links
 
 
 

1994 births
Sportspeople from Nalchik
Living people
Russian people of Ossetian descent
Russian footballers
Russian expatriate footballers
Association football midfielders
Russia youth international footballers
Russia under-21 international footballers
Russian Premier League players
Russian First League players
Belarusian Premier League players
Uzbekistan Super League players
Kazakhstan First Division players
PFC Spartak Nalchik players
FC Krasnodar players
FC Krasnodar-2 players
FC Volgar Astrakhan players
FC Fakel Voronezh players
FC Avangard Kursk players
FC Khimki players
FC Gomel players
Navbahor Namangan players
FC Okzhetpes players
Russian expatriate sportspeople in Belarus
Russian expatriate sportspeople in Uzbekistan
Russian expatriate sportspeople in Kazakhstan
Expatriate footballers in Belarus
Expatriate footballers in Uzbekistan
Expatriate footballers in Kazakhstan